Bright Esieme is a Nigerian professional footballer who plays as a defender for Enyimba.

International career
In January 2014, coach Stephen Keshi, invited him to be included in the Nigeria 23-man team for the 2014 African Nations Championship. He helped the team defeat Zimbabwe for a third-place finish by a goal to nil.

References

Living people
Nigeria A' international footballers
2014 African Nations Championship players
Nigerian footballers
1992 births
Association football defenders
Enyimba F.C. players